MS Riviera is an  (of 15 decks) which entered service with Oceania Cruises in May 2012.

Riviera was built by Fincantieri in Sestri Ponente, Italy, and was launched in July 2011.  The vessel was originally scheduled to be christened in Monte Carlo on 19 April 2012, but in January 2012 it was announced that the ship's maiden voyage would be delayed to May due to shipyard labor strikes.  Riviera was christened in Barcelona on 11 May 2012, and embarked on her 10-day maiden voyage from Venice to Athens on 16 May 2012.

Riviera has tonnage of 66,084 gross tons, with a capacity of 1,250 passengers housed in 625 staterooms.

Coronavirus pandemic 

During the coronavirus pandemic, the CDC reported, as early as 2020.04.22, that at least one person who tested positive for SARS-CoV-2 was symptomatic while on board.

References

External links 

 

2011 ships
Ships built by Fincantieri
Ships built in Genoa